Seoullo 7017 (Korean: 서울로 7017), also known as the Seoul Skygarden or Skypark, is an elevated, linear park in Seoul, built atop a former highway overpass. The path, which is about one kilometer in length and lined with 24,000 plants, is similar to New York City's High Line. Skygarden was designed by MVRDV, a Dutch firm, and opened in May 2017. In the future, the park may become an urban nursery, growing trees and plants for replanting elsewhere in the city. The path also improves walking times around the city's Central Station.

The disused overpass closed in 2015 and cuts diagonally across Seoul Station at 17m above street level. The '70' in the name comes from the year 1970 when the flyover was dedicated, while the '17' is both the number of walkways connected to it, and the year 2017. The park includes gardens, terraces, and exhibitions, and will "feature over 24,085 plants representing 228 species of trees, shrubs and flowers found in and outside Korea."

History 
In the 1960s, a decade after the Korean War, Seoul planners "ordered the construction of dozens of elevated highways to keep traffic flowing through the capital. Fast forward a few decades, and these hulking overpasses became not only a blight on the landscape, but also a safety risk." As the overpasses were gradually removed, city planners decided to re-purpose some as pedestrian green spaces in the crowded urban city. Seoul mayor Park Won Soon pushed for the US$52 million skypark to be completed as a complement to Seoul's Cheonggyecheon river restoration project, organized under previous mayor Lee Myung Bak.

The park's plans faced early controversy over fears of traffic congestion and concerns from market owners in nearby Namdaemun.

Location 
The Skypark begins at Malli-dong and continues northeast past Seoul Station, ending 1,024 meters later near Namdemun at Hoehyeon Station. The park is visible from Seoul Station but the nearest stairway is across the street from the front of the station, or subway exit 1 of the Seoul Metro.

References

Further reading

External links

See also
 High Line
Bloomingdale Trail

Parks in Seoul
2017 establishments in South Korea
Linear parks
Urban public parks
Elevated parks
Geography of Jung District, Seoul